This is a bibliography of sustainability publications.

Bibliography
 Atkinson, G., Dietz, S. & Neumayer, E. (2007). Handbook of Sustainable Development. Cheltenham: Edward Elgar Publishing. .
 Bartlett, A. (1998). Reflections on Sustainability, Population Growth, and the Environment—Revisited revised version (January 1998) paper first published in Population & Environment 16(1): 5–35. Retrieved on: 2009-03-12.
 Braungart, M., and W. McDonough (2002). Cradle to Cradle: Remaking the Way We Make Things. North Point Press. 
 Benyus, J. (1997). Biomimicry: Innovations Inspired by Nature. New York: William Morrow. .
 Blackburn, W.R. (2007). The Sustainability Handbook. London: Earthscan. .
 Costanza, R., Graumlich, L.J. & Steffen, W. (eds), (2007). Sustainability or Collapse? An Integrated History and Future of People on Earth. Cambridge, MA.: MIT Press. .
 Edwards, A.R., and B. McKibben (2010). Thriving Beyond Sustainability: Pathways to a Resilient Society, New Society Publishers. 
 Encyclopedia of Earth
 Formica, P. (2020). Nature's Voice: Health and Humanities Chicago: bioGraph. .
 
 Huesemann, M.H., and J.A. Huesemann (2011). Technofix: Why Technology Won't Save Us or the Environment, Chapter 6, "Sustainability or Collapse", New Society Publishers. 
 Jackson, T. (2011). Prosperity without Growth: Economics for a Finite Planet. Routledge.
  
 
 Li, R.Y.M. (2011). Building Our Sustainable Cities. Illinois: Common Ground Publishing. .
 
 Norton, B. (2005). Sustainability, A Philosophy of Adaptive Ecosystem Management. Chicago: The University of Chicago Press. .
 Rogers, P., K.F. Jalal, and J.A. Boyd (2007). An Introduction to Sustainable Development. Routledge.
 Welford, R. (1997). Hijacking Environmentalism: Corporate Responses to Sustainable Development. Routledge.

Sustainability